John William Kijazi (18 November 1956 – 17 February 2021) was a Tanzanian diplomat and Chancellor of the University of Dodoma. He was appointed  the Chief Secretary to the President of Tanzania on 9 March 2016 by the President John Magufuli.

References

External links

1956 births
2021 deaths
Tanzanian civil servants
University of Dar es Salaam alumni
Alumni of the University of Birmingham